Old Bonalbo is a rural village located 770 km north of Sydney, near Haystack Mountain in the Northern Rivers region of New South Wales, Australia. This village is on the Clarence Way between Bonalbo and Urbenville. This was the site of the original Bonalbo, the "Old" was added to its name in the early 1900s when a new settlement also called Bonalbo was built on the banks of Peacock Creek 11 kilometres to the south. The town's name supposedly derives from the Gidabal word 'Bunawalbu' meaning 'bloodwood trees'.

History
The first European settler in the area was J.D. McLean, a Scots settler who drove his sheep up from the Hunter Region in 1841 when the depression struck.  He established the 'Bunalbo' or Duck Creek run and later became a major pastoralist and the treasurer of Queensland.  The Robertson Land Acts of 1861 opened the territories up to free selectors (small landowners) but it was not until 1887 that the first, Donald McIntyre, took up a section of the old station, although the Robertson family had selected various sections themselves, possibly prior to 1880. It was at this time that Australian red cedar-getters first moved into the area.

The Bonalbo village later developed on a part of McIntyre's holding which fronted onto Peacock Creek.  However, the depression of the 1890s drove a number of selectors away, including McIntyre who sold his land to Paddy McNamee.  New selectors appeared in the 1900s when McNamee proved the land was arable and when sawmills opened up west of the range.

Population
In the 1961 census Old Bonalbo had a population of 240 and in 2006 it was recorded as having 281 people resident.

Services
Old Bonalbo has a Community Postal Agency operating between 8.30 a.m. and 10.30 a.m. Monday through Friday. Beef cattle grazing is the main agricultural activity of the region. A number of timber plantations have been planted in the area.

In January 2011 Old Bonalbo was isolated by floodwaters from Duck Creek which cut off the village and left many individual properties around the village isolated.

Notable people
 Canoeist family Jacqui, Kate and Ros Lawrence.

See also 
 Bonalbo

References

External links

Towns in New South Wales
Northern Rivers
Kyogle Council